William Breckenridge "Breck" Bowden (born 1951) is an American environmental scientist, currently the Robert and Genevieve Patrick Professor of Watershed Science & Planning and Director of the Vermont Water Resources and Lake Science Center, Rubenstein School of Environment and Natural Resources, University of Vermont, and also a published author.

References

Year of birth missing (living people)
Living people
American environmentalists
University of Vermont faculty
North Carolina State University alumni
University of Georgia alumni